The 2021 WNBA season was the 25th season of the Women's National Basketball Association (WNBA). The Seattle Storm were the defending champions. Due to the COVID-19 pandemic, teams played a 32-game season (rather than the 36 games agreed to in the original 2020 season schedule) that included mini two-game series to reduce travel. The regular season ran from May 14 to September 19, with a break from July 12 to August 11 for the Olympic Games.

This season also marked the launch of the WNBA Commissioner's Cup, which had been intended to start in the 2020 season but was delayed due to COVID-19. The first home game and first away game for each team against each of its conference opponents doubled as Cup games; all such games were played before the league took its Olympic break. The Cup final, officially called the Commissioner's Cup Championship Game, featured the conference leaders in the Cup standings and was held on August 12, three days before the rest of the league resumed play, at the Footprint Center in Phoenix, Arizona. A prize pool of $500,000 was provided for the Cup, with players on the winning team guaranteed a minimum bonus of $30,000 and those of the losing team guaranteed $10,000, and the championship game MVP receiving an extra $5,000. The Seattle Storm defeated the Connecticut Sun 79-57 to win the inaugural cup. Breanna Stewart was named MVP of the game.

The season had 100 games broadcast on national networks, including 25 across ABC and ESPN networks, 40 on CBS networks, and 35 on NBA TV. The remainder of games were broadcast on local networks and the WNBA's League Pass service; several games were also streamed on Twitter, Amazon Prime, and Oculus.

This season saw Wilson take over as the league's ball supplier. Spalding previously held the contract for the league's first 24 seasons.

2021 WNBA draft 

The New York Liberty won the first pick in the 2021 WNBA draft in the draft lottery, but the pick was later traded to the Dallas Wings who picked Charli Collier.

Transactions

Retirement 
 On February 8, 2021, Crystal Langhorne announced her retirement after thirteen seasons of playing in the WNBA. She won the 2018 and 2020 WNBA titles with the Seattle Storm. Langhorne was a two-time All-Star and won the Most Improved Player Award in 2009. She announced her retirement to become the Storm's Director of Community Engagement.
 On February 9, 2021, Renee Montgomery announced her retirement after eleven seasons of playing in the WNBA. She won the 2015 and 2017 WNBA titles with the Minnesota Lynx. Montgomery won the WNBA Sixth Woman of the Year award in 2012 and was a two-time All-Star.
 On March 8, 2021, LaToya Sanders announced her retirement after nine seasons playing in the WNBA.  She won the 2019 WNBA title with the Washington Mystics.
 On March 15, 2021, Morgan Tuck announced her retirement after five seasons playing in the WNBA.  She won the 2020 WNBA title with the Seattle Storm.
 On May 13, 2021, Seimone Augustus announced her retirement after fifteen seasons playing in the WNBA.  She was a four time WNBA Champion, eight time WNBA All-Star, one time WNBA Finals MVP, and she won WNBA Rookie of the Year in her rookie season.  In addition to her decorated WNBA career she spent time playing overseas in Russia and Turkey, where she won the EuroCup twice and Turkish Cup once.  Augustus joined the Los Angeles Sparks coaching staff.

Free agency 
Free agency negotiations started on January 15, 2021, and the signing period began on February 1, 2021.

Coaching changes

Regular season

All-Star Game

Standings

Schedule 

|-
| Thursday, April 15
| 7:00 p.m.
| colspan=3| 2021 WNBA draft
| colspan=6| USA: ESPNCanada: TSN2
| Virtually
|-
| Saturday, May 1
| 3:00 p.m.
| Minnesota Lynx
| @
| Atlanta Dream
| N/A
| 61–69
| Tied (12)
| Billings (7)
| C. Williams (5)
| Tied (2)
| Gateway Center Arena
|-
| Sunday, May 2
| 3:00 p.m.
| Los Angeles Sparks
| @
| Las Vegas Aces
| N/A
| 80–71
| colspan=4 | Scrimmage
| Michelob Ultra Arena
|-
| Wednesday, May 5
| 7:00 p.m.
| Atlanta Dream
| @
| Washington Mystics
| N/A
| 87–80
| T. Charles (18)
| Alleyne (12)
| Cloud (3)
| 5 tied (1)
| Entertainment and Sports Arena
|-
| rowspan=4 | Saturday, May 8
| 12:00 p.m.
| Connecticut Sun
| @
| Dallas Wings
| N/A
| 89–76
| B. Jones (22)
| C. Collier (10)
| Goodman (5)
| Tied (2)
| College Park Center
|-
| 2:00 p.m.
| Washington Mystics
| @
| Minnesota Lynx
| N/A
| 68–78
| Banham (23)
| Shepard (10)
| Achonwa (5)
| Alleyne (3)
| Target Center
|-
| 4:00 p.m.
| Las Vegas Aces
| @
| Los Angeles Sparks
| N/A
| 85–85
| Walker (23)
| Tied (9)
| Tied (5)
| Tied (3)
| Los Angeles Convention Center
|-
| 6:00 p.m.
| Seattle Storm
| @
| Phoenix Mercury
| N/A
| 88–71
| Magbegor (17)
| A. Smith (8)
| Canada (6)
| Magbegor (3)
| Phoenix Suns Arena1,985
|-
| Sunday, May 9
| 1:00 p.m.
| Chicago Sky
| @
| Indiana Fever
| N/A
| 65–82
| Tied (16)
| McCwoan (12)
| T. Mitchell (4)
| 4 tied (1)
| Bankers Life Fieldhouse
|-
| Tuesday, May 11
| 4:30 p.m.
| Indiana Fever
| @
| Chicago Sky
| N/A
| 70–83
| Vivians (15)
| Tied (6)
| Boyd-Jones (5)
| 4 tied (1)
| Wintrust Arena
|-

|-
! colspan=2 style="background:#094480; color:white" | 2021 WNBA regular season
|-

|-
| rowspan=5 | Friday, May 14
|-style="background:#FED8B1"
| 7:00 p.m.
| Indiana Fever
| @
| New York Liberty
| USA: NBA TV, YESCanada: SN1
| 87–90
| Laney (30)
| McCowan (16)
| Ionescu (11)
| McCowan (2)
| Barclays Center1,139
|-style="background:#FED8B1"
| 7:30 p.m.
| Connecticut Sun
| @
| Atlanta Dream
| Twitter
| 78–67
| J. Jones (26)
| Tied (8)
| Bonner (5)
| Billings (4)
| Gateway Center Arena561
|-style="background:#FED8B1"
| 9:00 p.m.
| Phoenix Mercury
| @
| Minnesota Lynx
| CBSSN
| 77–55
| Tied (18)
| Griner (12)
| Tied (5)
| 3 Tied (3)
| Target Center2,021
|-style="background:#FED8B1"
| 10:30 p.m.
| Dallas Wings
| @
| Los Angeles Sparks
| Facebook
| 94–71
| A. Gray (23)
| Thornton (11)
| Harris (7)
| Coffey (2)
| Los Angeles Convention CenterNo Fans
|-
| rowspan=3 | Saturday, May 15
|-style="background:#FED8B1"
| 1:00 p.m.
| Chicago Sky
| @
| Washington Mystics
| USA: ABCCanada: TSN5
| 70–56
| Copper (19)
| Tied (8)
| DeShields (5)
| Parker (3)
| Entertainment and Sports Arena1,050
|-style="background:#FED8B1"
| 3:00 p.m.
| Las Vegas Aces
| @
| Seattle Storm
| USA: ABCCanada: SN1
| 83–97
| Stewart (28)
| Stewart (13)
| Bird (8)
| Tied (2)
| Angel of the Winds Arena1,031
|-
| rowspan=3 | Sunday, May 16
|-style="background:#FED8B1"
| 2:00 p.m.
| New York Liberty
| @
| Indiana Fever
| CBSSN
| 73–65
| Laney (20)
| Lavender (15)
| Robinson (5)
| Tied (2)
| Bankers Life FieldhouseNo Fans
|-
| 7:00 p.m.
| Phoenix Mercury
| @
| Connecticut Sun
| CBSSN
| 78–86
| Bonner (27)
| J. Jones (13)
| January (6)
| Griner (4)
| Mohegan Sun Arena2,042
|-
| rowspan=3 | Tuesday, May 18
| 7:00 p.m.
| Minnesota Lynx
| @
| New York Liberty
| ESPN3
| 75–86
| Tied (26)
| Fowles (11)
| Ionescu (12)
| Powers (2)
| Barclays Center815
|-
| 8:00 p.m.
| Phoenix Mercury
| @
| Washington Mystics
| USA: ESPN2Canada: TSN5
| 91–70
| T. Charles (22)
| Turner (14)
| L. Mitchell (7)
| Tied (2)
| Entertainment and Sports Arena1,050
|-
| 10:00 p.m.
| Las Vegas Aces
| @
| Seattle Storm
| USA: ESPN2Canada: TSN5
| 96–80
| Stewart (26)
| Magbegor (13)
| C. Gray (7)
| Tied (3)
| Angel of the Winds Arena1,001
|-
| rowspan=3 | Wednesday, May 19
|-style="background:#FED8B1"
| 7:00 p.m.
| Chicago Sky
| @
| Atlanta Dream
| Facebook, WCIU
| 85–77
| C. Williams (24)
| Ndour (11)
| Vandersloot (8)
| 3 tied (3)
| Gateway Center Arena689
|-style="background:#FED8B1"
| 7:00 p.m.
| Indiana Fever
| @
| Connecticut Sun
| CBSSN
| 67–88
| Hiedeman (19)
| J. Jones (11)
| Hiedeman (6)
| McCowan (3)
| Mohegan Sun Arena2,084
|-
| rowspan=2 | Thursday, May 20
|-style="background:#FED8B1"
| 8:00 p.m.
| Seattle Storm
| @
| Minnesota Lynx
| USA: NBA TV, JoeTVCanada: TSN1/5
| 90–78
| Loyd (23)
| Fowles (9)
| Bird (8)
| 7 tied (1)
| Target Center1,934
|-
| rowspan=5 | Friday, May 21
|-style="background:#FED8B1"
| 7:00 p.m.
| Atlanta Dream
| @
| Indiana Fever
| Twitter
| 83–79
| Carter (23)
| Breland (16)
| T. Mitchell (6)
| 3 tied (2)
| Bankers Life Fieldhouse
|-style="background:#FED8B1"
| 7:00 p.m.
| New York Liberty
| @
| Washington Mystics
| USA: NBC Sports Washington, YESCanada: NBA TV Canada
| 72–101
| T. Charles (34)
| T. Charles (13)
| Cloud (8)
| Atkins (2)
| Entertainment and Sports Arena
|-
| 10:00 p.m.
| Connecticut Sun
| @
| Phoenix Mercury
| Facebook
| 84–67
| Diggins-Smith (20)
| J. Jones (11)
| Bonner (5)
| Griner (4)
| Phoenix Suns Arena4,101
|-style="background:#FED8B1"
| 10:30 p.m.
| Los Angeles Sparks
| @
| Las Vegas Aces
| CBSSN, MyLVTV, Spectrum SportsNet
| 69–97
| N. Ogwumike (19)
| Tied (10)
| C. Gray (6)
| Tied (3)
| Michelob Ultra Arena1,972
|-
| rowspan=2 | Saturday, May 22
|-style="background:#FED8B1"
| 8:00 p.m.
| Seattle Storm
| @
| Dallas Wings
| Facebook, Bally Sports Southwest Plus, JoeTV
| 100–97 (OT)
| Stewart (36)
| Thornton (12)
| Tied (6)
| Stewart (5)
| College Park Center1,491
|-
| rowspan=4 | Sunday, May 23
|-style="background:#FED8B1"
| 1:00 p.m.
| New York Liberty
| @
| Chicago Sky
| USA: ESPNCanada: NBA TV Canada
| 93–85
| DeShields (22)
| Hebard (10)
| Vandersloot (16)
| Hebard (4)
| Wintrust Arena1,332
|-style="background:#FED8B1"
| 1:00 p.m.
| Washington Mystics
| @
| Indiana Fever
| ESPN3
| 77–89
| T. Charles (31)
| Tied (10)
| Robinson (6)
| Breland (2)
| Bankers Life FieldhouseNo Fans
|-
| 6:00 p.m.
| Connecticut Sun
| @
| Las Vegas Aces
| Facebook, MyLVTV
| 72–65
| Bonner (22)
| J. Jones (11)
| Tied (5)
| Cambage (4)
| Michelob Ultra Arena1,954
|-
| Monday, May 24
| 7:00 p.m.
| Dallas Wings
| @
| New York Liberty
| USA: Twitter, YESCanada: TSN3
| 81–88
| Laney (26)
| Thornton (11)
| Harris (7)
| 4 tied (1)
| Barclays Center894
|-
| rowspan=4 | Tuesday, May 25
|-
| 7:00 p.m.
| Washington Mystics
| @
| Indiana Fever
| Monumental
| 85–69
| T. Charles (30)
| Hines-Allen (10)
| Cloud (7)
| Breland (2)
| Bankers Life FieldhouseNo Fans
|-style="background:#FED8B1"
| 8:00 p.m.
| Atlanta Dream
| @
| Chicago Sky
| CBSSN, WCIU
| 90–83
| Hayes (26)
| Tied (9)
| Vandersloot (6)
| 3 tied (2)
| Wintrust Arena1,004
|-
| 10:00 p.m.
| Connecticut Sun
| @
| Seattle Storm
| CBSSN, JoeTV, NESN+
| 87–90 (OT)
| J. Jones (28)
| J. Jones (13)
| J. Thomas (6)
| 4 tied (2)
| Angel of the Winds Arena1,011
|-
| rowspan=2 | Wednesday, May 26
|-style="background:#FED8B1"
| 10:00 p.m.
| Las Vegas Aces
| @
| Phoenix Mercury
| CBSSN, MyLVTV
| 85–79
| Tied (27)
| Griner (11)
| Diggins-Smith (11)
| Turner (4)
| Phoenix Suns Arena4,082
|-
| Thursday, May 27
| 7:00 p.m.
| Dallas Wings
| @
| Atlanta Dream
| USA: Bally Sports South, Bally Sports South PlusCanada: NBA TV Canada
| 95–101
| Hayes (26)
| Billings (11)
| C. Williams (5)
| 4 tied (1)
| Gateway Center Arena711
|-
| rowspan=5 | Friday, May 28
|-style="background:#FED8B1"
| 7:00 p.m.
| Washington Mystics
| @
| Connecticut Sun
| Facebook
| 81–86
| T. Charles (29)
| J. Jones (12)
| J. Jones (5)
| T. Charles (3)
| Mohegan Sun Arena2,102
|-
| 8:00 p.m.
| Los Angeles Sparks
| @
| Chicago Sky
| CBSSN, WCIU, Spectrum SportsNet
| 76–61
| Tied (14)
| Tied (9)
| Tied (6)
| 6 tied (1)
| Wintrust Arena1,124
|-style="background:#FED8B1"
| 10:00 p.m.
| Minnesota Lynx
| @
| Seattle Storm
| CBSSN, JoeTV
| 72–82
| Tied (15)
| Stewart (8)
| N. Collier (6)
| Tied (2)
| Angel of the Winds Arena1,332
|-
| 10:30 p.m.
| Indiana Fever
| @
| Las Vegas Aces
| Twitter, MyLVTV
| 77–113
| Hamby (25)
| McCowan (10)
| C. Gray (12)
| Wilson (2)
| Michelob Ultra ArenaNo Fans
|-
| rowspan=3 | Saturday, May 29
|-style="background:#FED8B1"
| 2:00 p.m.
| Atlanta Dream
| @
| New York Liberty
| Amazon Prime Video
| 90–87
| C. Williams (31)
| C. Williams (12)
| Laney (11)
| Tied (2)
| Barclays Center1,235
|-style="background:#FED8B1"
| 8:00 p.m.
| Phoenix Mercury
| @
| Dallas Wings
| USA: Bally Sports South PlusCanada: TSN5
| 89–85
| Griner (27)
| Griner (16)
| Diggins-Smith (7)
| Turner (4)
| College Park Center1,717
|-
| rowspan=4 | Sunday, May 30
|-
| 6:00 p.m.
| Los Angeles Sparks
| @
| Chicago Sky
| Facebook, WCIU, Spectrum SportsNet
| 82–79
| Vandersloot (28)
| Ndour-Fall (12)
| Tied (7)
| Zahui B (3)
| Wintrust Arena1,124
|-
| 6:00 p.m.
| Indiana Fever
| @
| Las Vegas Aces
| MyLVTV
| 78–101
| Hamby (22)
| Cambage (13)
| C. Gray (5)
| Cambage (5)
| Michelob Ultra Arena1,981
|-
| 7:00 p.m.
| Connecticut Sun
| @
| Minnesota Lynx
| USA: Bally Sports North, NESNCanada: SN1/SN360, NBA TV Canada
| 74–79 (OT)
| Fowles (24)
| Fowles (9)
| 4 tied (5)
| Fowles (3)
| Target Center2,007
|-

|-
| rowspan=4 | Tuesday, June 1
| 7:00 p.m.
| Las Vegas Aces
| @
| Connecticut Sun
| ESPN3, NESN+, MyLVTV
| 67–74
| Cambage (28)
| Tied (8)
| Tied (6)
| Tied (3)
| Mohegan Sun ArenaNo Fans
|-style="background:#FED8B1"
| 8:00 p.m.
| Los Angeles Sparks
| @
| Dallas Wings
| ESPN3, Bally Sports Southwest Plus
| 69–79
| Harris (18)
| 3 tied (7)
| Mabrey (6)
| Coffey (6)
| College Park Center1,372
|-
| 8:30 p.m.
| Phoenix Mercury
| @
| Chicago Sky
| USA: ESPNCanada: TSN3
| 84–83
| DeShields (26)
| Hebard (9)
| Vandersloot (10)
| Turner (3)
| Wintrust Arena1,217
|-
| 10:30 p.m.
| Indiana Fever
| @
| Seattle Storm
| USA: ESPN2Canada: TSN3
| 73–88
| Stewart (28)
| McCowan (14)
| Bird (8)
| McCowan (3)
| Angel of the Winds Arena1,215
|-
| rowspan=3 | Thursday, June 3
| 8:00 p.m.
| Las Vegas Aces
| @
| New York Liberty
| USA: YES, MyLVTVCanada: TSN1
| 94–82
| Wilson (30)
| Tied (13)
| Tied (9)
| Wilson (3)
| Barclays Center1,389
|-
| 10:00 p.m.
| Chicago Sky
| @
| Phoenix Mercury
| CBSSN, WCIU
| 74–77
| Diggins-Smith (28)
| Griner (12)
| Vandersloot (9)
| Griner (4)
| Phoenix Suns Arena3,819
|-
| 10:30 p.m.
| Indiana Fever
| @
| Los Angeles Sparks
| USA: Spectrum Sportsnet,Canada: NBA TV Canada
| 63–98
| Toliver (22)
| Robinson (8)
| Tied (5)
| Tied (2)
| Los Angeles Convention Center301
|-
| rowspan=2 | Friday, June 4
| 8:00 p.m.
| Atlanta Dream
| @
| Minnesota Lynx
| Facebook
| 84–86
| N. Collier (26)
| Fowles (11)
| Sims (6)
| Tied (1)
| Target Center2,024
|-style="background:#FED8B1"
| 10:00 p.m.
| Dallas Wings
| @
| Seattle Storm
| Amazon Prime Video, JoeTV
| 102–105 (OT)
| Loyd (25)
| Tied (9)
| Bird (10)
| Tied (2)
| Angel of the Winds Arena1,467
|-
| rowspan=3 | Saturday, June 5
| 1:00 p.m.
| Las Vegas Aces
| @
| Washington Mystics
| USA: ABCCanada: SN360
| 96–93
| Cambage (24)
| Wilson (15)
| C. Gray (8)
| Young (1)
| Entertainment and Sports Arena2,100
|-
| 3:00 p.m.
| Chicago Sky
| @
| Los Angeles Sparks
| USA: ABCCanada: SN360
| 63–68
| Wheeler (22)
| Zahui B (10)
| Wheeler (5)
| Zahui B (4)
| Los Angeles Convention Center430
|-style="background:#FED8B1"
| 7:00 p.m.
| New York Liberty
| @
| Connecticut Sun
| USA: NESN, YESCanada: SN1
| 64–85
| J. Jones (31)
| J. Jones (13)
| J. Thomas (9)
| 3 Tied (1)
| Mohegan Sun Arena2,118
|-
| rowspan=2 | Sunday, June 6
| 7:00 p.m.
| Atlanta Dream
| @
| Minnesota Lynx
| USA: Bally Sports North, Bally Sports SoutheastCanada: TSN3
| 80–100
| Hayes (21)
| Fowles (7)
| N. Collier (6)
| Tied (1)
| Target Center2,021
|-
| 7:00 p.m.
| Dallas Wings
| @
| Seattle Storm
| JoeTV
| 68–67
| Loyd (25)
| Harrison (8)
| Bird (5)
| Tied (2)
| Angel of the Winds Arena1,930
|-
| rowspan=2 | Tuesday, June 8
| 7:00 p.m.
| Minnesota Lynx
| @
| Washington Mystics
| USA: Twitter, NBC Sports WashingtonCanada: NBA TV Canada
| 81–85
| T. Charles (31)
| N. Collier (9)
| Cloud (9)
| Hines-Allen (3)
| Entertainment and Sports Arena2,100
|-style="background:#FED8B1"
| 10:00 p.m.
| Dallas Wings
| @
| Phoenix Mercury
| CBSSN, Bally Sports Arizona, Bally Sports Southwest
| 85–81
| Griner (27)
| Griner (16)
| Harris (7)
| 3 tied (2)
| Phoenix Suns Arena3,618
|-
| rowspan=2 | Wednesday, June 9
| 7:00 p.m.
| Seattle Storm
| @
| Atlanta Dream
| USA: Bally Sports Southeast, JoeTVCanada: TSN4
| 95–71
| Hayes (22)
| E. Williams (12)
| Canada (7)
| Stewart (2)
| Gateway Center Arena1,014
|-style="background:#FED8B1"
| 8:00 p.m.
| Indiana Fever
| @
| Chicago Sky
| CBSSN, WCIU
| 76–92
| K. Mitchell (24)
| Tied (9)
| Vandersloot (9)
| Breland (4)
| Wintrust Arena1,090
|-
| Thursday, June 10
| 7:00 p.m.
| Los Angeles Sparks
| @
| Washington Mystics
| CBSSN, NBC Sports Washington, Spectrum Sportsnet
| 71–89
| Atkins (23)
| T. Charles (10)
| Cloud (5)
| Plaisance (4)
| Entertainment and Sports Arena2,100
|-
| rowspan=2 | Friday, June 11
| 8:00 p.m.
| Seattle Storm
| @
| Atlanta Dream
| CBSSN, JoeTV
| 86–75
| Loyd (20)
| Stewart (13)
| Bird (7)
| Tied (1)
| Gateway Center Arena1,405
|-
| 10:00 p.m.
| Dallas Wings
| @
| Phoenix Mercury
| 
| 77–59
| Ogunbowale (20)
| Alarie (9)
| Diggins-Smith (5)
| Diggins-Smith (3)
| Phoenix Suns Arena4,261
|-
| rowspan=3 | Saturday, June 12
|- style="background:#FED8B1"
| 1:00 p.m.
| Chicago Sky
| @
| Indiana Fever
| Amazon Prime Video, WCIU
| 83–79
| Tied (20)
| Parker (20)
| L. Allen (6)
| 3 tied (2)
| Indiana Farmers ColiseumNo Fans
|-style="background:#FED8B1"
| 8:00 p.m.
| Los Angeles Sparks
| @
| Minnesota Lynx
| USA: Bally Sports NorthCanada: NBA TV Canada
| 64–80
| Cooper (17)
| Fowles (9)
| Toliver (5)
| Fowles (4)
| Target Center2,203
|-
| rowspan=4 | Sunday, June 13
| 2:00 p.m.
| Seattle Storm
| @
| Connecticut Sun
| Facebook, JoeTV
| 89–66
| Stewart (22)
| Stewart (9)
| Stewart (5)
| Magbegor (3)
| Mohegan Sun Arena2,248
|-style="background:#FED8B1"
| 3:30 p.m.
| Washington Mystics
| @
| Atlanta Dream
| USA: NBA TV, Bally Sports SouthCanada: TSN2
| 78–101
| C. Williams (21)
| Tied (7)
| Tied (6)
| T. Charles (3)
| Gateway Center Arena1,122
|-style="background:#FED8B1"
| 6:00 p.m.
| Dallas Wings
| @
| Las Vegas Aces
| MyLVTV, Bally Sports Southwest Plus
| 78–85
| Wilson (28)
| Wilson (14)
| Ogunbowale (8)
| Tied (2)
| Michelob Ultra ArenaNo Fans
|-
| 6:00 p.m.
| New York Liberty
| @
| Phoenix Mercury
| USA: Bally Sports Arizona Plus, YESCanada: TSN2
| 85–83
| Griner (29)
| Griner (14)
| Laney (10)
| Griner (2)
| Phoenix Suns Arena4,476
|-
| rowspan=3 | Tuesday, June 15
| 7:00 p.m.
| Seattle Storm
| @
| Indiana Fever
| JoeTV
| 87–70
| K. Mitchell (26)
| Stewart (12)
| Canada (6))
| Breland (3)
| Indiana Farmers ColiseumNo Fans
|-
| 9:00 p.m.
| Chicago Sky
| @
| Minnesota Lynx
| USA: ESPN2Canada: NBA TV Canada
| 105–89
| N. Collier (27)
| Fowles (9)
| Vandersloot (13)
| 5 tied (1)
| Target Center2,024
|-
| 10:00 p.m.
| New York Liberty
| @
| Las Vegas Aces
| ESPN3, MyLVTV
| 78–100
| Plum (32)
| Cambage (11)
| Laney (6)
| 6 tied (1)
| Michelob Ultra Arena2,115
|-
| rowspan=2 | Wednesday, June 16
|-style="background:#FED8B1"
| 10:30 p.m.
| Phoenix Mercury
| @
| Los Angeles Sparks
| Amazon Prime Video, Spectrum Sportsnet
| 80–85
| Griner (30)
| Turner (12)
| Tied (10)
| Tied (2)
| Los Angeles Convention Center514
|-
| rowspan=5 | Thursday, June 17
| 7:00 p.m.
| Seattle Storm
| @
| Indiana Fever
| Facebook, JoeTV
| 79–69
| Stewart (21)
| Stewart (15)
| Bird (7)
| Breland (4)
| Indiana Farmers ColiseumNo Fans
|-style="background:#FED8B1"
| 7:00 p.m.
| Atlanta Dream
| @
| Washington Mystics
| USA: NBC Sports WashingtonCanada: TSN2
| 93–96
| Plaisanace (25)
| Tied (9)
| Cloud (11)
| Tied (2)
| Entertainment and Sports Arena2,100
|-style="background:#FED8B1"
| 8:00 p.m.
| Connecticut Sun
| @
| Chicago Sky
| Twitter
| 75–81
| J. Thomas (20)
| B. Jones (12)
| Vandersloot (10)
| Bonner (3)
| Wintrust Arena1,293
|-style="background:#FED8B1"
| 8:00 p.m.
| Minnesota Lynx
| @
| Dallas Wings
| CBSSN
| 85–73
| McBride (22)
| Fowles (12)
| Clarendon (5)
| N. Coller (2)
| College Park Center1,519
|-
| 10:00 p.m.
| New York Liberty
| @
| Las Vegas Aces
| CBSSN
| 76–103
| Laney (20)
| Hamby (12)
| Plum (7)
| Tied (2)
| Michelob Ultra ArenaNo Fans
|-
| Friday, June 18
| 10:30 p.m.
| Phoenix Mercury
| @
| Los Angeles Sparks
| CBSSN
| 80–66
| Diggins-Smith (21)
| Tied (8)
| Tied (4)
| Tied (2)
| Los Angeles Convention Center520
|-
| rowspan=3 | Saturday, June 19
| 2:00 p.m.
| Connecticut Sun
| @
| Chicago Sky
| CBS
| 81–91
| B. Jones (22)
| Copper (9)
| Vandersloot (11)
| Parker (3)
| Wintrust Arena1,293
|-style="background:#FED8B1"
| 7:00 p.m.
| Indiana Fever
| @
| Washington Mystics
| USA: NBC Sports WashingtonCanada: NBA TV Canada
| 77–82
| T. Charles (30)
| T. Charles (15)
| Robinson (6)
| Tied (2)
| Entertainment and Sports Arena2,100
|-
| 8:00 p.m.
| Minnesota Lynx
| @
| Dallas Wings
| USA: Bally Sports Southwest Plus, Bally Sports North PlusCanada: TSN2
| 77–95
| Mabrey (28)
| Alarie (8)
| Tied (6)
| Fowles (2)
| College Park Center1,751
|-
| Sunday, June 20
| 4:00 p.m.
| New York Liberty
| @
| Los Angeles Sparks
| USA: ESPNCanada: SN360
| 76–73
| Wheeler (20)
| Whitcomb (9)
| Wheeler (10)
| R. Allen (3)
| Los Angeles Convention Center731
|-
| rowspan=3 | Tuesday, June 22
| 7:00 p.m.
| Dallas Wings
| @
| Connecticut Sun
| USA: League PassCanada: TSN3/5
| 70–80
| B. Jones (26)
| Bonner (13)
| Bonner (6)
| Tied (2)
| Mohegan Sun Arena2,076
|-style="background:#FED8B1"
| 7:00 p.m.
| Chicago Sky
| @
| New York Liberty
| Amazon Prime Video, WCIU
| 92–72
| Parker (23)
| Parker (12)
| Vandersloot (10)
| 3 tied (2)
| Barclays Center1,419
|-
| 10:00 p.m.
| Washington Mystics
| @
| Seattle Storm
| JoeTV, Monmumental
| 87–83
| T. Charles (34)
| T. Charles (16)
| Loyd (9)
| Stewart (5)
| Angel of the Winds Arena2,495
|-
| Wednesday, June 23
| 7:00 p.m.
| Minnesota Lynx
| @
| Atlanta Dream
| USA: Bally Sports Southeast Extra, Bally Sports North PlusCanada: TSN5
| 87–85
| Fowles (26)
| Fowles (19)
| Clarendon (9)
| Fowles (5)
| Gateway Center Arena907
|-
| rowspan=3 | Thursday, June 24
| 7:00 p.m.
| Dallas Wings
| @
| Indiana Fever
| CBSSN
| 89–64
| K. Mitchell (24)
| Sabally (9)
| Ogunbowale (5)
| Sabally (2)
| Indiana Farmers ColiseumNo Fans
|-
| 7:00 p.m.
| Chicago Sky
| @
| New York Liberty
| USA: Twitter, YES, WCIUCanada: NBA TV Canada
| 91–68
| Tied (18)
| Parker (11)
| Vandersloot (9)
| Onyenwere (3)
| Barclays Center2,148
|-
| 10:30 p.m.
| Washington Mystics
| @
| Los Angeles Sparks
| USA: Spectrum Sportsnet, MonumentalCanada: NBA TV Canada
| 82–89
| Tied (26)
| T. Charles (10)
| Atkins (7)
| 3 tied (2)
| Los Angeles Convention Center520
|-
| rowspan=2 | Friday, June 25
|-style="background:#FED8B1"
| 8:00 p.m.
| Las Vegas Aces
| @
| Minnesota Lynx
| Facebook, MyLVTV
| 89–90 (OT)
| Fowles (30)
| Cambage (20)
| Tied (7)
| Fowles (4)
| Target Center2,734
|-
| rowspan=2 | Saturday, June 26
| 1:00 p.m.
| Washington Mystics
| @
| Dallas Wings
| CBS
| 74–85
| Ogunbowale (30)
| T. Charles (10)
| L. Mitchell (7)
| Sabally (2)
| College Park Center2,055
|-style="background:#FED8B1"
| 7:00 p.m.
| New York Liberty
| @
| Atlanta Dream
| USA: Bally Sports South, YESCanada: SN360
| 101–78
| Whitcomb (30)
| Shook (11)
| Ionescu (8)
| Stokes (2)
| Gateway Center Arena1,605
|-
| rowspan=4 | Sunday, June 27
|-style="background:#FED8B1"
| 2:00 p.m.
| Chicago Sky
| @
| Connecticut Sun
| NESN+, WCIU
| 58–74
| Bonner (23)
| Mompremier (11)
| Vandersloot (7)
| Dolson (2)
| Mohegan Sun Arena2,014
|-style="background:#FED8B1"
| 4:00 p.m.
| Seattle Storm
| @
| Las Vegas Aces
| USA: ESPNCanada: SN360
| 92–95 (OT)
| Stewart (35)
| 3 tied (11)
| C. Gray (7)
| Stewart (3)
| Michelob Ultra Arena3,766
|-style="background:#FED8B1"
| 6:00 p.m.
| Los Angeles Sparks
| @
| Phoenix Mercury
| Facebook, Bally Sports Arizona Plus
| 79–88
| Taurasi (25)
| Griner (15)
| 3 tied (4)
| Griner (2)
| Phoenix Suns Arena7,304
|-
| rowspan=2 | Tuesday, June 29
| 7:00 p.m.
| New York Liberty
| @
| Atlanta Dream
| USA: ESPN3, Bally Sports SoutheastCanada: NBA TV Canada
| 69–73
| C. Williams (18)
| Shook (8)
| Laney (7)
| Tied (2)
| Gateway Center Arena1,131
|-style="background:#FED8B1"
| 7:00 p.m.
| Connecticut Sun
| @
| Washington Mystics
| USA: ESPN2Canada: TSN3
| 90–71
| T. Charles (26)
| J. Jones (16)
| Bonner (7)
| T. Charles (3)
| Entertainment and Sports Arena2,100
|-
| rowspan=3 | Wednesday, June 30
| 8:00 p.m.
| Chicago Sky
| @
| Dallas Wings
| CBSSN, Bally Sports Southwest Plus, WCIU
| 91–81
| Harrison (23)
| Parker (10)
| Vandersloot (12)
| Tied (2)
| College Park Center1,778
|-style="background:#FED8B1"
| 10:00 p.m.
| Minnesota Lynx
| @
| Phoenix Mercury
| CBSSN, Bally Sports Arizona, Bally Sports North Plus
| 82–76
| Griner (28)
| Tied (11)
| Tied (7)
| Fowles (2)
| Phoenix Suns Arena4,122
|-style="background:#FED8B1"
| 10:30 p.m.
| Las Vegas Aces
| @
| Los Angeles Sparks
| Amazon Prime Video, Spectrum Sportsnet, MyLVTV
| 99–75
| Zahui B (22)
| Cambage (11)
| Gray (8)
| Tied (2)
| Los Angeles Convention Center746
|-

|-
| rowspan=2 | Thursday, July 1
|-style="background:#FED8B1"
| 7:00 p.m.
| Connecticut Sun
| @
| Indiana Fever
| Amazon Prime Video, NESN
| 86–80
| B. Jones (34)
| McCowan (8)
| Tied (7)
| J. Jones (2)
| Indiana Farmers ColiseumNo Fans
|-
| rowspan=3 | Friday, July 2
| 8:00 p.m.
| Chicago Sky
| @
| Dallas Wings
| CBSSN, Bally Sports Southwest Plus, WCIU
| 91–100
| Mabrey (28)
| Sabally (9)
| Vandersloot (9)
| Sabally (3)
| College Park Center2,187
|-
| 10:00 p.m.
| Las Vegas Aces
| @
| Los Angeles Sparks
| CBSSN, Spectrum Sportsnet, MyLVTV
| 66–58
| Wilson (20)
| Zahui B (12)
| Wheeler (5)
| Coffey (4)
| Los Angeles Convention Center959
|-
| 10:00 p.m.
| Atlanta Dream
| @
| Seattle Storm
| Twitter, JoeTV
| 88–91
| C. Williams (20)
| Tied (8)
| Tied (7)
| Stewart (3)
| Angel of the Winds Arena3,011
|-
| rowspan=3 | Saturday, July 3
| 1:00 p.m.
| Connecticut Sun
| @
| Indiana Fever
| USA: NBA TV, NESN+Canada: SN1
| 67–73
| Robinson (19)
| McCowan (12)
| Tied (4)
| Breland (3)
| Indiana Farmers ColiseumNo Fans
|-style="background:#FED8B1"
| 1:00 p.m.
| Washington Mystics
| @
| New York Liberty
| CBSSN, YES, Monumental
| 79–82
| T. Charles (31)
| T. Charles (16)
| Tied (5)
| T. Charles (3)
| Barclays Center1,615
|-
| 10:00 p.m.
| Minnesota Lynx
| @
| Phoenix Mercury
| Facebook, Bally Sports Arizona Plus, Bally Sports North Plus
| 99–68
| McBride (24)
| Fowles (10)
| Tied (6)
| Fowles (3)
| Phoenix Suns Arena8,182
|-
| rowspan=2 | Sunday, July 4
| 6:00 p.m.
| Atlanta Dream
| @
| Las Vegas Aces
| USA: NBA TV, MyLVTV, Canada: TSN5
| 95–118
| Plum (23)
| Tied (10)
| Sims (13)
| 3 tied (1)
| Michelob Ultra Arena2,705
|-style="background:#FED8B1"
| 9:00 p.m.
| Seattle Storm
| @
| Los Angeles Sparks
| USA: NBA TV, Antenna TVCanada: SN360
| 84–74
| Stewart (21)
| Sykes (10)
| 3 tied (5)
| Zahui B (3)
| Los Angeles Convention Center716
|-
| Monday, July 5
| 7:00 p.m.
| Dallas Wings
| @
| New York Liberty
| Facebook, YES
| 96–99
| Whitcomb (26)
| Shook (8)
| Ionescu (12)
| Sabally (3)
| Barclays Center1,677
|-
| rowspan=4 | Wednesday, July 7
|-style="background:#FED8B1"
| 8:00 p.m.
| Dallas Wings
| @
| Minnesota Lynx
| USA: ESPN2Canada: NBA TV Canada
| 79–85
| McBride (25)
| Fowles (11)
| Clarendon (8)
| Collier (4)
| Target Center2,321
|-style="background:#FED8B1"
| 10:00 p.m.
| Phoenix Mercury
| @
| Las Vegas Aces
| Amazon Prime Video, MyLVTV
| 99–90 (OT)
| Griner (33)
| Tied (12)
| Diggins-Smith (8)
| Griner (3)
| Michelob Ultra Arena3,013
|-style="background:#FED8B1"
| 10:00 p.m.
| Los Angeles Sparks
| @
| Seattle Storm
| CBSSN, Antenna TV
| 62–71
| Stewart (27)
| Stewart (11)
| Bird (5)
| Tied (2)
| Angel of the Winds Arena2,730
|-
| rowspan=5 | Friday, July 9
|-style="background:#FED8B1"
| 7:00 p.m.
| Atlanta Dream
| @
| Connecticut Sun
| CBSSN, NESN+
| 72–84
| J. Jones (24)
| J. Jones (16)
| Hiedeman (5)
| E. Williams (2)
| Mohegan Sun Arena2,286
|-
| 7:00 p.m.
| New York Liberty
| @
| Indiana Fever
| USA: NBA TV, YESCanada: TSN4
| 69–82
| Laney (23)
| Laney (8)
| Tied (5)
| McCowan (4)
| Indiana Farmers ColiseumNo Fans
|-style="background:#FED8B1"
| 9:00 p.m.
| Seattle Storm
| @
| Phoenix Mercury
| USA: ESPNCanada: TSN3/4
| 77–85
| Griner (29)
| Griner (15)
| Diggins-Smith (6)
| Diggins-Smith (2)
| Phoenix Suns Arena7,554
|-style="background:#FED8B1"
| 10:30 p.m.
| Minnesota Lynx
| @
| Las Vegas Aces
| ESPN3, MyLVTV
| 77–67
| Tied (18)
| Stokes (12)
| Clarendon (9)
| Wilson (3)
| Michelob Ultra ArenaNo Fans
|-
| rowspan=2 | Saturday, July 10
|-style="background:#FED8B1"
| 8:00 p.m.
| Washington Mystics
| @
| Chicago Sky
| Amazon Prime Video, WCIU
| 89–85 (OT)
| T. Charles (34)
| T. Charles (17)
| Vandersloot (15)
| Paker (2)
| Wintrust Arena8,331
|-
| rowspan=6 | Sunday, July 11
|-style="background:#FED8B1"
| 1:00 p.m.
| Las Vegas Aces
| @
| Dallas Wings
| USA: ABCCanada: TSN5
| 95–79
| Tied (22)
| Wilson (13)
| Wilson (8)
| Tied (3)
| College Park Center2,533
|-style="background:#FED8B1"
| 2:00 p.m.
| Connecticut Sun
| @
| New York Liberty
| USA: ESPN3, NESN+, YESCanada: SN360
| 71–54
| J. Jones (17)
| J. Jones (17)
| J. Jones (5)
| Tied (1)
| Barclays Center1,988
|-style="background:#FED8B1"
| 5:00 p.m.
| Indiana Fever
| @
| Atlanta Dream
| Facebook, Bally Sports Southeast
| 79–68
| McCowan (21)
| McCowan (14)
| Robinson (9)
| McCowan (3)
| Gateway Center Arena1,897
|-style="background:#FED8B1"
| 6:00 p.m.
| Phoenix Mercury
| @
| Seattle Storm
| CBSSN, JoeTV
| 75–82
| Nurse (28)
| Russell (10)
| Peddy (7)
| 3 tied (1)
| Angel of the Winds Arena5,110
|-style="background:#FED8B1"
| 9:00 p.m.
| Minnesota Lynx
| @
| Los Angeles Sparks
| USA: Bally Sports North Plus, Spectrum SportsnetCanada: SN360
| 86–61
| N. Collier (27)
| Tied (8)
| Clarendon (8)
| Fowles (3)
| Los Angeles Convention Center892
|-style="background:#FAFAD2"
| Wednesday, July 14
| 7:00 p.m.
| Team USA
| @
| Team WNBA
| USA: ESPNCanada: TSN3/5, SN
| 85–93
| Ogunbowale (26)
| J. Jones (14)
| Bird (8)
| Tied (2)
| Michelob Ultra Arena5,175
|-

|-
| rowspan=2 | Thursday, August 12
|-style="background:#FED8B1"
| 9:00 p.m.
| Connecticut Sun
| @
| Seattle Storm
| Amazon Prime Video
| 57–79
| Stewart (17)
| J. Jones (11)
| Bird (5)
| Stewart (3)
| Footprint Center5,006
|-
| rowspan=6 | Sunday, August 15
| 4:00 p.m.
| Seattle Storm
| @
| Chicago Sky
| ABC
| 85–87
| Loyd (26)
| Russell (11)
| Vandersloot (11)
| Magbegor (3)
| Wintrust Arena6,231
|-
| 4:00 p.m.
| Connecticut Sun
| @
| Dallas Wings
| ESPN3, Bally Sports Southwest Plus, NESN+
| 80–59
| Ogunbowale (20)
| J. Jones (15)
| Tied (5)
| K. Charles (2)
| College Park Center2,399
|-
| 6:00 p.m.
| Washington Mystics
| @
| Las Vegas Aces
| MyLVTV, Monumental
| 83–84
| 3 tied (20)
| Wilson (14)
| C. Gray (11)
| 3 tied (1)
| Michelob Ultra Arena3,024
|-
| 6:00 p.m.
| Atlanta Dream
| @
| Phoenix Mercury
| CBSSN
| 81–92
| C. Williams (30)
| Turner (17)
| Diggins-Smith (7)
| Turner (4)
| Footprint Center7,491
|-
| 7:00 p.m.
| New York Liberty
| @
| Minnesota Lynx
| Facebook, YES
| 78–88
| Howard (30)
| Fowles (11)
| Clarendon (8)
| N. Collier (5)
| Target Center3,534
|-
| 9:00 p.m.
| Indiana Fever
| @
| Los Angeles Sparks
| USA: Spectrum SportsnetCanada: SN
| 70–75
| K. Mitchell (20)
| Zahui B (9)
| Tied (6)
| Zahui B (3)
| Staples Center2,029
|-
| rowspan=5 | Tuesday, August 17
| 7:00 p.m.
| Minnesota Lynx
| @
| Connecticut Sun
| Amazon Prime Video, NESN+
| 60–72
| J. Thomas (19)
| J. Jones (13)
| J. Thomas (5)
| 4 tied (1)
| Mohegan Sun Arena3,488
|-
| 8:00 p.m.
| Dallas Wings
| @
| Chicago Sky
| CBSSN, WCIU
| 80–76
| Quigley (27)
| Thornton (10)
| Vandersloot (12)
| Dolson
| Wintrust Arena3,902
|-
| 10:00 p.m.
| Washington Mystics
| @
| Las Vegas Aces
| CBSSN, MyLVTV
| 83–93
| T. Charles (30)
| Wilson (14)
| Cloud (8)
| Wilson (3)
| Michelob Ultra Arena3,241
|-
| 10:00 p.m.
| Indiana Fever
| @
| Phoenix Mercury
| Facebook, Bally Sports Arizona Plus
| 80–84
| Griner (25)
| Turner (11)
| Taurasi (7)
| Griner (4)
| Footprint Center4,089
|-
| 10:30 p.m.
| Atlanta Dream
| @
| Los Angeles Sparks
| USA: NBA TV, Spectrum OverflowCanada: NBA TV Canada
| 80–85 (OT)
| Sims (26)
| Tied (9)
| N. Ogwumike (9)
| Tied (2)
| Staples Center2,200
|-
| Wednesday, August 18
| 7:00 p.m.
| Seattle Storm
| @
| New York Liberty
| CBSSN, JoeTV
| 79–83
| Loyd (35)
| Tied (7)
| Laney (8)
| Tied (2)
| Barclays Center2,103
|-
| rowspan=3 | Thursday, August 19
| 7:00 p.m.
| Minnesota Lynx
| @
| Connecticut Sun
| USA: NBA TV, NESNCanada: TSN1/4
| 71–82
| Bonner (31)
| Tied (11)
| Clarendon (8)
| N. Collier (2)
| Mohegan Sun Arena3,536
|-
| 10:00 p.m.
| Washington Mystics
| @
| Phoenix Mercury
| USA: Twitter, Bally Sports ArizonaCanada: NBA TV Canada
| 64–77
| Griner (30)
| Turner (14)
| Griner (5)
| 3 tied (2)
| Footprint Center5,113
|-
| 10:30 p.m.
| Atlanta Dream
| @
| Los Angeles Sparks
| USA: NBA TV, Spectrum SportsnetCanada: SN360
| 64–66
| C. Williams (23)
| C. Williams (11)
| Toliver (5)
| Tied (2)
| Staples Center1,885
|-
| rowspan=2 | Friday, August 20
| 7:00 p.m.
| Seattle Storm
| @
| New York Liberty
| Amazon Prime Video, JoeTV
| 99–83
| Loyd (29)
| Stewart (14)
| Whitcomb (8)
| Howard (3)
| Barclays Center3,889
|-
| 8:00 p.m.
| Indiana Fever
| @
| Dallas Wings
| CBSSN, Bally Sports Southwest Plus
| 83–81
| Harrison (22)
| Harrison (7)
| Ogunbowale (6)
| Tied (3)
| College Park Center2,017
|-
| rowspan=2 | Saturday, August 21
| 12:00 p.m.
| Phoenix Mercury
| @
| Atlanta Dream
| USA: ESPN2Canada: TSN3/5
| 84–69
| Diggins Smith (25)
| Griner (12)
| Diggins Smith (7)
| 4 tied (2)
| Gateway Center Arena2,073
|-
| 8:00 p.m.
| Minnesota Lynx
| @
| Chicago Sky
| USA: NBA TV, WCIUCanada: SN1
| 101–95
| Tied (27)
| Tied (7)
| Vandersloot (8)
| Tied (3)
| Wintrust Arena5,036
|-
| rowspan=2 | Sunday, August 22
| 2:00 p.m.
| Los Angeles Sparks
| @
| New York Liberty
| USA: ESPN3, YES, Spectrum SportsnetCanada: SN1
| 86–83
| 3 tied (17)
| Howard (11)
| Laney (9)
| Tied (2)
| Barclays CenterN/A
|-
| 3:00 p.m.
| Seattle Storm
| @
| Washington Mystics
| USA: ESPNCanada: NBA TV Canada
| 85–78
| Tied (20)
| Hines-Allen (17)
| Cloud (9)
| Stewart (5)
| Entertainment and Sports Arena3,114
|-
| rowspan=4 | Tuesday, August 24
| 7:00 p.m.
| Seattle Storm
| @
| Minnesota Lynx
| USA: ESPN2Canada: TSN2
| 70–76
| Fowles (29)
| Fowles (20)
| Bird (7)
| Tied (3)
| Target Center3,634
|-
| 7:00 p.m.
| Chicago Sky
| @
| Atlanta Dream
| USA: ESPN3, Bally Sports Southeast, WCIUCanada: SN1
| 86–79
| Quigley (21)
| Parker (9)
| Vandersloot (10)
| E. Williams (4)
| Gateway Center Arena1,292
|-
| 7:00 p.m.
| Las Vegas Aces
| @
| Connecticut Sun
| ESPN3, NESN+, MyLVTV
| 62–76
| January (19)
| J. Jones (10)
| J. Thomas (6)
| Bonner (2)
| Mohegan Sun Arena4,012
|-
| 7:00 p.m.
| Los Angeles Sparks
| @
| Washington Mystics
| USA: ESPN3, NBC Sports Washington, Spectrum SportsnetCanada: NBA TV Canada
| 68–78
| Hines-Allen (19)
| Tied (8)
| Cloud (8)
| McCall (3)
| Entertainment and Sports Arena2,620
|-
| Wednesday, August 25
| 7:00 p.m.
| Phoenix Mercury
| @
| New York Liberty
| USA: NBA TV, YESCanada: SN1
| 106–79
| Diggins-Smith (27)
| Turner (15)
| Taurasi (9)
| Tied (2)
| Barclays Center1,872
|-
| rowspan=3 | Thursday, August 26
| 7:00 p.m.
| Las Vegas Aces
| @
| Atlanta Dream
| USA: NBA TV, Bally Sports Southeast, MyLVTVCanada: TSN2
| 78–71
| Tied (21)
| Wilson (12)
| Plum (8)
| Billings (4)
| Gateway Center Arena2,182
|-
| 7:00 p.m.
| Los Angeles Sparks
| @
| Connecticut Sun
| USA: NESN+, Spectrum SportsnetCanada: SN1
| 72–76
| B. Jones (23)
| J. Jones (11)
| Wheeler (9)
| Coffey
| Mohegan Sun Arena3,702
|-
| 7:00 p.m.
| Dallas Wings
| @
| Washington Mystics
| Amazon Prime Video, NBC Sports Washington, Bally Sports Southwest Plus
| 82–77
| Ogunbowale (26)
| Harrison (10)
| Ogunbowale (9)
| 6 tied (1)
| Entertainment and Sports Arena2,465
|-
| rowspan=2 | Friday, August 27
| 8:00 p.m.
| Phoenix Mercury
| @
| New York Liberty
| CBSSN
| 80–64
| Diggins-Smith (27)
| Vaughn (11)
| Ionescu (9)
| R. Allen (3)
| Barclays Center2,315
|-
| 10:00 p.m.
| Chicago Sky
| @
| Seattle Storm
| USA: NBA TV, JoeTV, WCIUCanada: NBA TV Canada
| 73–69
| Copper (26)
| Stevens (10)
| Vandersloot (8)
| Magbegor (2)
| Angel of the Winds Arena3,650
|-
| rowspan=3 | Saturday, August 28
| 1:00 p.m.
| Las Vegas Aces
| @
| Indiana Fever
| USA: NBA TV, Bally Sports Indiana, MyLVTVCanada: SN
| 87–71
| Tied (15)
| McCowan (13)
| McCowan (7)
| Cambage (3)
| Indiana Farmers ColiseumN/A
|-
| 7:00 p.m.
| Los Angeles Sparks
| @
| Connecticut Sun
| USA: NBA TV, NESN+, Spectrum SportsnetCanada: SN1
| 61–76
| B. Jones (16)
| B. Jones (15)
| Wheeler (7)
| 6 tied (1)
| Mohegan Sun Arena4,434
|-
| 7:00 p.m.
| Dallas Wings
| @
| Washington Mystics
| Facebook, NBC Sports Washington, Bally Sports Southwest Plus
| 75–76
| Ogunbowale (25)
| Harrison (9)
| Tied (5)
| Zellous (2)
| Entertainment and Sports Arena2,410
|-
| Sunday, August 29
| 6:00 p.m.
| Chicago Sky
| @
| Seattle Storm
| Facebook, KCPQ, WCIU
| 107–75
| Parker (25)
| Tied (9)
| Vandersloot (10)
| Tied (2)
| Angel of the Winds Arena3,750
|-
| rowspan=4 | Tuesday, August 31
| 7:00 p.m.
| Los Angeles Sparks
| @
| Indiana Fever
| Twitter, Bally Sports Indiana
| 72–74
| K. Mitchell (25)
| McCowan (19)
| Wheeler (7)
| 4 tied (1)
| Indiana Farmers ColiseumN/A
|-
| 7:00 p.m.
| Connecticut Sun
| @
| Washington Mystics
| NBA TV, NBC Sports Washington, NESN+
| 85–75
| J. Jones (31)
| J. Jones (14)
| Cloud (12)
| J. Jones (3)
| Entertainment and Sports Arena2,269
|-
| 8:00 p.m.
| New York Liberty
| @
| Minnesota Lynx
| Amazon Prime Video, Bally Sports North Plus
| 66–74
| McBride (25)
| N. Collier (14)
| Ionescu (6)
| R. Allen (3)
| Target Center3,221
|-
| 10:00 p.m.
| Chicago Sky
| @
| Phoenix Mercury
| USA: NBA TV, Bally Sportsnet Arizona Plus, WCIUCanada: NBA TV Canada
| 83–103
| Nurse (21)
| Stevens (9)
| Diggins-Smith (10)
| Copper (3)
| Footprint Center5,838
|-

|-
| rowspan=4 | Thursday, September 2
| 8:00 p.m.
| Atlanta Dream
| @
| Dallas Wings
| Facebook, Bally Sports Southwest, Bally Sports South
| 68–72
| C. Williams (25)
| Billings (11)
| C. Williams (7)
| E. Williams (4)
| College Park Center1,975
|-
| 8:00 p.m.
| Los Angeles Sparks
| @
| Minnesota Lynx
| USA: NBA TV, Bally Sports NorthCanada: SN360
| 57–66
| McBride (17)
| Fowles (17)
| Wheeler (7)
| Tied (2)
| Target Center3,121
|-
| 10:00 p.m.
| Chicago Sky
| @
| Las Vegas Aces
| USA: NBA TV, MyLVTV, WCIUCanada: SN360
| 83–90
| Parker (30)
| Parker (14)
| Vandersloot (8)
| Tied (3)
| Michelob Ultra ArenaN/A
|-
| 10:00 p.m.
| New York Liberty
| @
| Seattle Storm
| Amazon Prime Video, JoeTV, YES
| 75–85
| Stewart (33)
| Stewart (8)
| Ionescu (7)
| Tied (2)
| Angel of the Winds Arena3,592
|-
| rowspan=2 | Saturday, September 4
| 1:00 p.m.
| Phoenix Mercury
| @
| Indiana Fever
| USA: NBA TV, Bally Sports Indiana, Bally Sports ArizonaCanada: TSN5
| 87–65
| Griner (22)
| Turner (11)
| Taurasi (7)
| Breland (3)
| Indiana Farmers ColiseumN/A
|-
| 8:00 p.m.
| Washington Mystics
| @
| Minnesota Lynx
| USA: NBA TV, Bally Sports NorthCanada: SN1
| 75–93
| Atkins (25)
| N. Collier (9)
| Banham (8)
| Fowles (3)
| Target Center3,403
|-
| rowspan=2 | Sunday, September 5
| 1:00 p.m.
| Las Vegas Aces
| @
| Chicago Sky
| USA: ABCCanada: SN1
| 84–92
| Plum (23)
| Parker (13)
| Parker (8)
| Stokes (3)
| Wintrust Arena5,210
|-
| 4:00 p.m.
| Atlanta Dream
| @
| Dallas Wings
| CBSSN, Bally Sports Southwest Plus
| 69–64
| Hayes (22)
| Tied (14)
| Harris (6)
| E. Williams (3)
| College Park Center2,386
|-
| Monday, September 6
| 7:00 p.m.
| Phoenix Mercury
| @
| Indiana Fever
| USA: NBA TVCanada: TSN2
| 86–81
| K. Mitchell (23)
| McCowan (15)
| Allen (7)
| Diggins-Smith (3)
| Indiana Farmers ColiseumN/A
|-
| rowspan=2 | Tuesday, September 7
| 8:00 p.m.
| Connecticut Sun
| @
| Dallas Wings
| Amazon Prime Video, Bally Sports Southwest Plus, NESN+
| 83–56
| B. Jones (18)
| B. Jones (10)
| J. Thomas (6)
| J. Jones (3)
| College Park Center1,945
|-
| 10:00 p.m.
| Washington Mystics
| @
| Seattle Storm
| CBSSN, JoeTV
| 71–105
| Loyd (20)
| Gustafson (8)
| Bird (7)
| Tied (1)
| Angel of the Winds Arena2,390
|-
| rowspan=2 | Wednesday, September 8
| 7:00 p.m.
| Phoenix Mercury
| @
| Atlanta Dream
| USA: NBA TVCanada: SN360
| 76–75
| C. Williams (20)
| Turner (15)
| Tied (5)
| 6 tied (1)
| Gateway Center Arena1,215
|-
| 9:00 p.m.
| Minnesota Lynx
| @
| Las Vegas Aces
| USA: ESPN2Canada: TSN3
| 81–102
| Young (29)
| Fowles (11)
| Gray (14)
| 7 tied (1)
| Michelob Ultra Arena5,663
|-
| Thursday, September 9
| 10:30 p.m.
| Connecticut Sun
| @
| Los Angeles Sparks
| USA: NBA TV, Spectrum Sportsnet, NESNCanada: TSN2
| 75–57
| J. Jones (21)
| J. Jones (14)
| Bonner (5)
| J. Jones (2)
| Staples Center1,695
|-
| rowspan=2 | Friday, September 10
| 7:00 p.m.
| Atlanta Dream
| @
| Washington Mystics
| USA: NBA TV, NBC Sports Washington: NBA TV Canada
| 74–82
| Charles (26)
| Charles (16)
| 3 tied (6)
| Tied (2)
| Entertainment and Sports Arena2,320
|-
| 8:00 p.m.
| Indiana Fever
| @
| Minnesota Lynx
| Twitter
| 72–89
| Powers (20)
| McCowan (9)
| Allen (6)
| Fowles (5)
| Target Center3,503
|-
| rowspan=2 | Saturday, September 11
| 8:00 p.m.
| New York Liberty
| @
| Dallas Wings
| USA: Bally Sports Southwest PlusCanada: SN1
| 76–77
| Mabrey (21)
| Tied (11)
| 3 tied (6)
| Ionescu (2)
| College Park Center2,888
|-
| 10:00 p.m.
| Connecticut Sun
| @
| Phoenix Mercury
| USA: NESN+Canada: SN1
| 76–67
| Griner (25)
| J. Jones (16)
| Tied (5)
| Griner (3)
| Footprint Center9,811
|-
| rowspan=3 | Sunday, September 12
| 3:00 p.m.
| Washington Mystics
| @
| Chicago Sky
| USA: ABCCanada: NBA TV Canada
| 79–71
| Charles (31)
| Parker (11)
| Cloud (8)
| Plaisance (1)
| Wintrust Arena4,707
|-
| 7:00 p.m.
| Indiana Fever
| @
| Minnesota Lynx
| USA: NBA TVCanada: NBA TV Canada
| 80–90
| K. Mitchell (25)
| Tied (8)
| Tied (7)
| McCowan
| Target Center3,434
|-
| 9:00 p.m.
| Seattle Storm
| @
| Los Angeles Sparks
| USA: NBA TV, Spectrum Sportsnet, JoeTVCanada: SN
| 53–81
| Cooper (19)
| Sykes (10)
| Wheeler (4)
| Coffey (2)
| Staples Center4,181
|-
| Monday, September 13
| 3:00 p.m.
| Dallas Wings
| @
| Las Vegas Aces
| USA: NBA TV, MyLVTV, Bally Sports Southwest PlusCanada: TSN3/5
| 75–85
| Plum (30)
| Wilson (12)
| Mabrey (7)
| Kuier (3)
| Michelob Ultra ArenaN/A
|-
| Tuesday, September 14
| 7:00 p.m.
| Indiana Fever
| @
| Atlanta Dream
| USA: NBA TV, Bally Sports SoutheastCanada: SN1
| 78–85
| Hayes (31)
| McCowan (14)
| McDonald (6)
| McCowan (5)
| Gateway Center Arena1,208
|-
| Wednesday, September 15
| 7:00 p.m.
| New York Liberty
| @
| Connecticut Sun
| CBSSN, NESN+
| 69–98
| Howard (25)
| J. Jones (13)
| Tied (5)
| Howard (3)
| Mohegan Sun Arena4,012
|-
| Thursday, September 16
| 7:00 p.m.
| Los Angeles Sparks
| @
| Atlanta Dream
| Amazon Prime Video, Bally Sports Southeast
| 74–68
| Hayes (25)
| Tied (10)
| Wheeler (4)
| Tied (1)
| Gateway Center Arena2,537
|-
| rowspan=4 | Friday, September 17
| 7:00 p.m.
| Minnesota Lynx
| @
| Indiana Fever
| CBSSN, Bally Sports North Plus
| 92–73
| K. Mitchell (26)
| McCowan (12)
| Allen (7)
| Tied (2)
| Indiana Farmers ColiseumN/A
|-
| 7:00 p.m.
| Washington Mystics
| @
| New York Liberty
| Twitter, YES
| 91–80
| Atkins (29)
| Howard (10)
| Laney (11)
| T. Charles (3)
| Barclays Center3,615
|-
| 8:00 p.m.
| Las Vegas Aces
| @
| Chicago Sky
| USA: NBA TV, WCIU, MyLVTVCanada: NBA TV Canada
| 103–70
| R. Williams (22)
| Stokes (13)
| Tied (7)
| Parker (4)
| Wintrust Arena4,911
|-
| 10:00 p.m.
| Phoenix Mercury
| @
| Seattle Storm
| USA: NBA TV, JoeTVCanada: TSN2
| 85–94
| Loyd (37)
| Griner (13)
| Bird (7)
| Griner (2)
| Angel of the Winds Arena6,000
|-
| rowspan=5 | Sunday, September 19
| 1:00 p.m.
| Atlanta Dream
| @
| Connecticut Sun
| USA: NBA TV, NESN+Canada: NBA TV Canada
| 64–84
| C. Williams (18)
| B. Jones (12)
| Tied (4)
| J. Jones (2)
| Mohegan Sun Arena4,724
|-
| 3:00 p.m.
| Las Vegas Aces
| @
| Phoenix Mercury
| USA: ABCCanada: SN1
| 84–83
| Plum (23)
| Turner (8)
| Diggins-Smith (7)
| Park (2)
| Footprint Center9,724
|-
| 3:00 p.m.
| Minnesota Lynx
| @
| Washington Mystics
| USA: ESPN3, NBC Sports WashingtonCanada: TSN2
| 83–77
| Powers (27)
| Tied (13)
| Clarendon (6)
| N. Collier (2)
| Entertainment and Sports Arena2,854
|-
| 5:00 p.m.
| Los Angeles Sparks
| @
| Dallas Wings
| USA: NBA TV, Bally Sports Southwest PlusCanada: TSN2
| 84–87
| Cooper (24)
| N. Ogwumike (10)
| Wheeler (7)
| N. Ogwumike (2)
| College Park Center3,604
|-
| 6:00 p.m.
| Indiana Fever
| @
| Chicago Sky
| CBSSN, WCIU
| 87–98
| K. Mitchell (32)
| McCowan (9)
| Allen (10)
| 6 tied (1)
| Wintrust ArenaN/A
|-

|-
! colspan=2 style="background:#094480; color:white" | 2021 WNBA postseason
|-

|-
| rowspan=2 | Thursday, September 23
| 8:00 p.m.
| Dallas Wings
| @
| Chicago Sky
| USA: ESPN2Canada: SN1
| 64–81
| Copper (23)
| Parker (15)
| Parker (7)
| 5 tied (1)
| Wintrust Arena4,672
|-
| 10:00 p.m.
| New York Liberty
| @
| Phoenix Mercury
| USA: ESPN2Canada: SN1, NBA TV Canada
| 82–83
| Laney (25)
| Tied (10)
| Ionescu (11)
| Tied (3)
| Grand Canyon University Arena5,827
|-

|-

|-
| rowspan=2 | Sunday, September 26
| 3:00 p.m.
| Phoenix Mercury
| @
| Seattle Storm
| USA: ABCCanada: TSN5, NBA TV Canada
| 85–80 (OT)
| Griner (23)
| Griner (16)
| Diggins-Smith (6)
| Turner (3)
| Angel of the Winds ArenaN/A
|-
| 5:00 p.m.
| Chicago Sky
| @
| Minnesota Lynx
| USA: ESPN2Canada: TSN5
| 89–76
| Powers (24)
| Copper (10)
| Vandersloot (5)
| Fowles (2)
| Target Center4,334
|-

|-

|-
| rowspan=2| Tuesday, September 28
| 8:00 p.m.
| Chicago Sky
| @
| Connecticut Sun
| USA: EPSN2Canada: SN1
| 101–95 (2OT)
| J. Jones (26)
| J. Jones (11)
| Vandersloot (18)
| 4 tied (2)
| Mohegan Sun Arena4,720
|-
| 10:00 p.m.
| Phoenix Mercury
| @
| Las Vegas Aces
| USA: ESPN2Canada: SN1, NBA TV Canada
| 90–96
| R. Williams (26)
| Wilson (9)
| Gray (12)
| 3 tied (2)
| Michelob Ultra Arena7,009
|-
| rowspan=2| Thursday, September 30
| 8:00 p.m.
| Chicago Sky
| @
| Connecticut Sun
| USA: EPSN2Canada: SN360
| 68–79
| Tied (15)
| A. Thomas (11)
| Tied (6)
| Parker (3)
| Mohegan Sun Arena6,088
|-
| 10:00 p.m.
| Phoenix Mercury
| @
| Las Vegas Aces
| USA: ESPN2Canada: TSN5, NBA TV Canada
| 117–91
| Taurasi (37)
| Wilson (9)
| Tied (7)
| 3 tied (2)
| Michelob Ultra Arena6,432
|-
| rowspan=2| Sunday, October 3
| 1:00 p.m.
| Connecticut Sun
| @
| Chicago Sky
| USA: ESPNCanada: TSN2
| 83–86
| Copper (26)
| Stevens (11)
| Vandersloot (13)
| J. Jones (4)
| Wintrust Arena7,421
|-
| 3:00 p.m.
| Las Vegas Aces
| @
| Phoenix Mercury
| USA: ABCCanada: TSN2
| 60–87
| Turner (23)
| Turner (17)
| Diggins-Smith (9)
| Griner (3)
| Desert Financial Arena7,090
|-
| rowspan=2| Wednesday, October 6
| 8:00 p.m.
| Connecticut Sun
| @
| Chicago Sky
| USA: ESPNCanada: TSN4
| 69–79
| J. Jones (25)
| J. Jones (11)
| Parker (7)
| 4 tied (2)
| Wintrust Arena
|-
| 10:00 p.m.
| Las Vegas Aces
| @
| Phoenix Mercury
| USA: ESPNCanada: TSN4
| 93–76
| Gray (22)
| Wilson (12)
| Tied (6)
| Turner (3)
| Footprint Center11,255
|-
| Friday, October 8
| 9:00 p.m.
| Phoenix Mercury
| @
| Las Vegas Aces
| USA: ESPN2Canada: TSN4
| 87–84
| Griner (28)
| Tied (11)
| Diggins-Smith (8)
| Turner (3)
| Michelob Ultra Arena9,680
|-

|-

|-
| October 10
| 3:00 p.m.
| Chicago Sky
| @
| Phoenix Mercury
| USA: ABCCanada: SN, NBA TV Canada
| 91–77
| Copper (21)
| Copper (10)
| Vandersloot (11)
| Parker (2)
| Footprint Center10,191
|-
| October 13
| 9:00 p.m.
| Chicago Sky
| @
| Phoenix Mercury
| USA: ESPNCanada: TSN2
| 86–91 (OT)
| Griner (29)
| 5 tied (9)
| Vandersloot (14)
| Stevens (4)
| Footprint Center13,685
|-
| October 15
| 9:00 p.m.
| Phoenix Mercury
| @
| Chicago Sky
| USA: ESPN2Canada: TSN2
| 50–86
| Copper (22)
| Turner (7)
| Vandersloot (10)
| Tied (2)
| Wintrust Arena10,378
|-
| October 17
| 3:00 p.m.
| Phoenix Mercury
| @
| Chicago Sky
| USA: ESPNCanada: SN, NBA TV Canada
| 74–80
| Griner (28)
| Parker (13)
| Vandersloot (15)
| Tied (2)
| Wintrust Arena10,378
|-

Note: Games highlighted in  ██ represent Commissioner’s Cup games.

Statistical Leaders 
The following shows the leaders in each statistical category during the 2021 regular season.

Playoffs

The WNBA continued its current playoff format for 2021. The top eight teams, regardless of conference, make the playoffs, with the top two teams receiving a bye to the semi-finals. The remaining six teams play in two single-elimination playoff rounds, with the third and fourth seeds receiving a bye to the second round.

Season award winners

Player of the Week Award

Player of the Month Award

Rookie of the Month Award

Coach of the Month Award

Postseason awards
The award previously titled "Sixth Woman of the Year" was changed to "Sixth Player" starting with this season.
{| class="wikitable" style="width: 80%; text-align:center; font-size:90%"
!colspan=2 width=150|Award
!width=125|Winner
!width=125|Position
!width=125|Team
!width=125|Votes/Statistic
|-
|colspan=2| Most Valuable Player Award
| Jonquel Jones
| Forward/Center
| Connecticut Sun
| 48 of 49
|-
| colspan=2 | Finals MVP Award
| Kahleah Copper
| Guard/Forward
| Chicago Sky
| 
|-
|colspan=2| Rookie of the Year Award
| Michaela Onyenwere
| Forward
| New York Liberty
| 47 of 49
|-
|colspan=2| Most Improved Player Award
| Brionna Jones
| Forward
| Connecticut Sun
| 38 of 49
|-
|colspan=2| Defensive Player of the Year Award
| Sylvia Fowles
| Center
| Minnesota Lynx
| 31 of 49
|-
|colspan=2| Sixth Player of the Year Award
| Kelsey Plum
| Guard
| Las Vegas Aces
| 41 of 49
|-
|colspan=2| Kim Perrot Sportsmanship Award
| Nneka Ogwumike
| Forward
| Los Angeles Sparks
| 19 of 46
|-
|colspan=2| Peak Performer: Points
| Tina Charles
| Center
| Washington Mystics
| 23.4 ppg
|-
|colspan=2| Peak Performer: Rebounds
| Jonquel Jones
| Forward/Center
| Connecticut Sun
| 11.2 rpg
|-
|colspan=2| Peak Performer: Assists
| Courtney Vandersloot
| Guard
| Chicago Sky
| 8.6 apg
|-
|colspan=2| Coach of the Year Award
| Curt Miller
| Coach
| Connecticut Sun
| 41 of 49
|-
|colspan=2| Basketball Executive of the Year Award
| Dan Padover
| General manager
| Las Vegas Aces
| 9 ballots
|-
!Team
!width=125|Guard
!Guard
!Forward
!Forward
!Center
|-
| All-WNBA First Team
| Skylar Diggins-Smith
| Jewell Loyd
| Jonquel Jones
| Breanna Stewart
| Brittney Griner
|-
| All-WNBA Second Team
| Arike Ogunbowale
| Courtney Vandersloot
| A'ja Wilson
| Tina Charles
| Sylvia Fowles
|-
| All-Defensive First Team
| Brittney Sykes
| Briann January
| Jonquel Jones
| Brianna Turner
| Sylvia Fowles
|-
| All-Defensive Second Team| Jasmine Thomas
| Ariel Atkins
| Breanna Stewart
| Brionna Jones
| Brittney Griner
|-
| All-Rookie Team'| Dana Evans
| Aari McDonald
| DiDi Richards
| Michaela Onyenwere
| Charli Collier
|}

 Coaches 

 Eastern Conference 

 Western Conference Notes:''
 Year with team does not include 2021 season.
 Records are from time at current team and are through the end of the 2020 regular season.
 Playoff appearances are from time at current team only.
 WNBA Finals and Championships do not include time with other teams.
 Coaches shown are the coaches who began the 2021 season as head coach of each team.

References 

 
Women's National Basketball Association seasons
WNBA